DTI may refer to:

Science and technology
 Deep trench isolation; See Shallow trench isolation
 Dial test indicator
 Direct trader input, in the history of electronic data interchange
 Diffusion tensor imaging, a structural medical imaging technique
 Direct thrombin inhibitor
 Diesel turbo injection, a brand name for common rail
 Direct tension indicator
 Deep tissue injury, see suspected deep tissue injury in List of medical abbreviations: S
 Dye transfer inhibitor

Organizations
 Defence Technology Institute, the Thai defence technology public organisation
 Department of Trade and Industry (disambiguation), a government department in several countries
 Detroit, Toledo and Ironton Railroad
 Diversified Technology, Inc.
 Directorate of Terrorist Identities, responsible for the Terrorist Identities Datamart Environment

Other uses
 Debt-to-income ratio, in the mortgage industry